Andy Roddick was the defending champion, but he retired from professional tennis in September 2012. Feliciano López won the title beating in the final Gilles Simon, 7–6(7–2), 6–7(5–7), 6–0 for the third title of his career, first since 2010.

Seeds
The top four seeds receive a bye into the second round.

Draw

Finals

Top half

Bottom half

Qualifying

Seeds

Qualifiers

Draw

First qualifier

Second qualifier

Third qualifier

Fourth qualifier

References
 Main Draw
 Qualifying Draw

Aegon Internationalandnbsp;- Singles
2013 Men's Singles